Arun Belbase known professionally as Arun Chhetri  is a Nepalese actor and dancer from Ghorahi, Dang. Chhetri started his career in 2017 with the web series Lastai Rag Bho, produced and distributed by Highlight Nepal; however Chhetri gained recognition from his 2022 movie Mahapurush. Mahapurush is a 2022 Nepali drama film written and directed by Pradip Bhattarai. The film stars Maha Jodi (Madan Krishna Shrestha and Hari Bansha Acharya), along with Gauri Malla, Rabindra Singh Baniya, Rajaram Paudel, and Anjana Baraili.

Early life 
Chhetri started his acting career professionally in 2017 with the web series Lastai Rag Bho; later the same year Chhetri appeared in the short movie Mayako Sansar. Chhetri auditioned and was selected for the lead role for the movie Mahapurush (released in 2022), which brought him to the limelight. After Mahapurush Chhetri's other movie (Prema) will release on 31 March 2023.

Movies 
 Lastai Rag bho - 2017
 Mayako Sansar - 2017
 Mahapurush -2022
 Prema - 2023 (releasing on 31 March 2023) 
 Jackie : i am 21 ( releasing on 4 May 2023 )

References 

Living people

1996 births

21st-century Nepalese male actors

People from Dang District, Nepal
Nepalese male film actors
Nepalese businesspeople
Nepalese male dancers
Nepalese male stage actors
21st-century Nepalese dancers